Yersinia nurmii is a Gram-negative species of Yersinia that was originally isolated in packaged broiler meat cuts. The type strain is APN3a-c (=DSM 22296 = LMG 25213).

Etymology
Yersinia nurmii, N.L. gen. masc. n. nurmii, of Nurmi, in honor of Professor Esko Nurmi, a distinguished researcher in the field of food microbiology, who, with his colleagues, introduced the concept of competitive exclusion.

References

External links
LPSN: Species Yersinia nurmii

nurmii
Bacteria described in 2011